Srinagar is a village development committee in Mugu District in the Karnali Zone of north-western Nepal. The district capital of Gamgadhi is located within it. At the time of the 1991 Nepal census it had a population of 2256 people living in 411 individual households.

References

External links
UN map of the municipalities of Mugu District

Populated places in Mugu District